San Juan Ostuncalco, is a town, with a population of 20,763 (2018 census), and a municipality in the Quetzaltenango department of Guatemala. Beside Spanish, local people speak the Mam language.

Mercedarian doctrine

After the Spanish conquest of Guatemala in the 1520s, the "Presentación de Guatemala" Mercedarian province was formed in 1565; originally, the order of the Blessed Virgin Mary of Mercy had gotten from bishop Francisco Marroquín several doctrines in the Sacatepéquez and Chimaltenango valleys, close to the capital Santiago de los Caballeros de Guatemala, but they traded those with the Order of Preachers friars in exchange for the doctrines those had in the Sierra de los Cuchumatanes area. During the first part of the 17th century they also had doctrine in four town close to the city of Santiago, which eventually became city neighborhoods: Espíritu Santo, Santiago, San Jerónimo and San Anton —which was the capital of the Mercedarians, where they had their convent and where their comendador lived.

According to bishop Juan de las Cabezas memoir in 1613 and the bishop Pedro Cortés y Larraz parish visit minutes from 1770, the Mercedarians came to have nine doctrines, and numerous annexes, which were: Santa Ana de Malacatán, Concepción de Huehuetenango, San Pedro de Solomá, Nuestra Señora de la Purificación de Jacaltenango, Nuestra Señora de la Candelaria de Chiantla, San Andrés de Cuilco, Santiago de Tejutla, San Pedro de Sacatepéquez, and San Juan de Ostuncalco.

However, in 1754, due to the borbon reforms implemented by the Spanish kings, the Mercedarins -and the rest of the regular clergy for that matter-, had to transfer their doctrines to the secular clergy, thus losing their San Juan Ostuncalco doctrine.

The 1765 Guatemala earthquake had its epicenter near Ostuncalco.

Traditions

The "Baile del Torito" is a local dance from San Juan Ostuncalco.

Climate 

San Juan Ostuncalco municipal capital has temperate climate (Köppen: Cwb).

Geographic location 
Ostuncalco municipality is surrounded by Quetzaltenango Department municipalities, except on the West, where it borders San Marcos Department:

See also
 
 
 List of places in Guatemala

Notes and references

References

Bibliography

 
 
 

Municipalities of the Quetzaltenango Department